Agathangelou is a Greek surname  Αγαθαγγέλου. Notable people with the surname include:

Andrea Agathangelou (born 1989), South African cricketer
Ben Agathangelou (born 1971), English Formula One designer
Mariana Agathangelou (born 1988), British badminton player

Greek-language surnames